Fox Networks Group (FNG) is a subsidiary of The Walt Disney Company that oversees the international television assets that were acquired from former 21st Century Fox in March 2019. It produces and distributes more than 300 entertainment, film, sports and factual channels in 45 languages across Europe, Middle East, Africa and Asia (also formerly in Latin America before rebranded to Star on February 22, 2021), using several brands, including Fox, Fox Sports, and BabyTV.

Until March 2019, the group also included the U.S. unit which consisted of Fox Television Group, Fox Cable Networks, Fox Sports Media Group, Fox News Group, National Geographic Partners, and Fox Networks Digital Consumer Group. Following Disney's acquisition of 21CF, FNG's U.S. unit was dispersed between the Murdoch's Fox Corporation and Walt Disney Television, while the non-U.S. units (previously known as Fox International Channels, a unit previously operated jointly with 21CF's U.S. domestic broadcast units until 2016, when the units were merged into Fox Networks Group) were later integrated into Disney's direct-to-consumer and international unit through 2020. Among their non-linear brands were Fox Play and Fox Plus. These brands reached over 1.725 billion households around the world.

History

United States

Fox Networks Group was formed in 1993 to serve as the unit for the international multi-media business owned at the time by Rupert Murdoch's News Corporation after the purchase of STAR TV with the purpose to serve its international channels.

In 2008, Fox Broadcasting and 20th Century Fox Television formed Fox Inkubation, a joint initiative for new animation talent that would allow them to produce two minute shorts as pilots for new series. Fox TV had concurrently started its animation division 20th Century Fox Television Animation with Jennifer Howell, the same executive heading up both Inkubation and Fox TV Animation. In 2012, Inkubation was discontinued as plans for a late night animation block moved forward and none of its projects got on the air. In May 2013, Howell exited Fox at the end of her contract.

Fox Television Group was formed in July 2014, encompassing of Fox Broadcasting and 20th Century Fox Television, and placed under Fox Networks Group. In June 2014, Fox Networks Group and Gail Berman formed The Jackal Group to provide programming for its various channels.

In July 2014, Fox Networks Group and DNA Films formed DNA TV Limited. Fox Networks Group would have global-first rights with co-financing options to the joint venture's shows. DNA TV would be managed by DNA Films management with Eric Schrier, president of original programming for FX Networks and FX Productions, handling Fox's interest.

In 2015, 21st Century Fox and the National Geographic Society formed a new joint venture named National Geographic Partners that would oversee the Society's commercial ventures. This included the U.S. domestic version of National Geographic-branded TV channels, but Fox Networks Group would continue to handle advertisement sales and distribution of these channels.

In January 2016, 21st Century Fox announced a major reorganization of its non-U.S. television businesses. Fox International Channels (FIC), which have been operating separately from 21CF's U.S. domestic television businesses, would be abolished, and the head of its regional divisions would report to Fox Networks Group CEO Peter Rice and COO Randy Freer, thus absorbing international television businesses into Fox Networks Group.

In January 2017, Fox Network Group and 20th Century Fox formed FoxNext, which would handle video game developments, VR experiences and theme park businesses.

International

In 1997, Fox International Channels purchased NHNZ, a producer of documentaries. NHNZ had a stake in Singapore-based Beach House Pictures.

In 2001, Fox International Channels entered the Spanish market with Fox and National Geographic Channel adding Fox Crime later on.

In January 2004, the FX289 channel for UK and Ireland was launched, later rebranded as FX as it moved to Sky EPG in April 2005. The channel was rebranded as Fox on January 11, 2013.

In early 2006, Fox International Channels formed a production company called Fox Toma 1 with Argentine content producer Ernesto Sandler. FIC purchased a majority interest in Telecolombia, renaming the production company Fox Telecolombia in June 2007. This was to boost Spanish-language original shows for Latin American and the US. Fox Telecolombia would still provide Telefutura and RCN Colombian network with programming. In September 2007, FIC purchased a majority share in the international operations of BabyTV with the  founders retaining the original Israel business.

In 2007, the Argentinian Utilisima lifestyle channel, which launched in 1996, was sold to Fox International Channels. The channel went global in 2008, with the addition of a Portuguese feed, and ended up being distributed across Latin America, Canada, Spain, New Zealand and Australia and the United States. The US version of the channel launched in May 2010. In 2013, it was rebranded as MundoFox and stopped being available internationally outside of Latin America (excluding Brazil). In July 2017, it was rebranded as Nat Geo Kids. Its Brazilian feed was launched separately on October of that same year.

National Geographic Channels International attempted to launch new sister channels in Nat Geo in India, Nat Geo Wild, Nat Geo Adventure, Nat Geo Music and Nat Geo HD, by making them available to the market in May 2008. Fox International Channels launched the new Nat Geo channels again along with FX, Fox Crime and BabyTV to add to its existing Fox History and the main Nat Geo channel in June 2010.

In January 2008, Fox International Channels purchased a controlling stake in Real Estate TV (RETV), a UK property-themed channel. In April 2008, FIC launched Fox Next in Portugal, on Meo's Meo Mix package. Fox Next targets 25-to-44-year-olds and is programmed with series and movies with thematic primetime and weekday blocks.

In 2008, FIC and Rotana Media Services launched Fox Movies and Fox Series channels in the Middle East market. Fox then purchased a stake in Rotana, while the joint venture agreed with Disney to carry Disney and American Broadcasting Company content on the two channels for four years. With Abu Dhabi Media Company in July 2009, FIC started National Geographic Abu Dhabi Channel.

Fox Life channel was original developed in Italy then launched in Balkans, Bulgaria, Italy, Japan, Korea, Latin America, Poland, Portugal, Russia and Turkey. FIC made the channel available in Greece on December 1, 2008, in English with Greek dubbing.

An independent sales and marketing agency was set up in Tallinn, Estonia in June 2009. In March 2011, a Baltic regional office was set up in Tallinn with the independent marketing agency owner, Karoli Kindriks, as regional manager reporting to Ase Ytreland, Managing Director of Fox International Channels for Nordic & Baltic Region.

On August 19, 2009, News Corporation announced that it would reorganize their Asia-Pacific subsidiary Star Group in Hong Kong. Star Group was split into Star India and Star Greater China. A few of such arrangements were that the original Star TV company would take over representation of FIC's channels in the region from NGC Network Asia, LLC, and Star itself would transform into a regional operation of Fox International Channels. Meanwhile, Star India would handle Fox-branded channels in India.

In early March 2010, Fox International Channels agreed to move its Middle East and North Africa market channels' operations from Hong Kong and other locations to an Abu Dhabi facility. Its NHNZ subsidiary would also open a production office in Abu Dhabi. .Fox, a global online ad network business, would also establish its Middle East operation. In May 2010, FIC purchased a stake in Aquavision, a Johannesburg, South Africa production company, to be managed by NHNZ.

In June 2010, FIC and Jan Dekker Holdings formed a joint venture to operate 24Kitchen in the Dutch market. On September 1, 2011, Fox Channels Benelux launched 24Kitchen on UPC in the Netherlands, in partnership with Jan Dekker Holdings. It was later launched on other television providers on October 1, 2011.

In April 2011, FIC Nordic launched Fox Crime in Norway. Suomi TV, a Finnish free-to-air TV channel, was acquired in January  2012 and then rebranded as Fox in April 2012, expanding the channel's air time to 12 hours while adding FIC's co-produced series The Walking Dead along with 20th Century Fox Television Distribution, National Geographic Channel and 24Kitchen content.

On July 1, 2011, Fox Movies was made available in Portugal on pay TV services and Angola and Mozambique on free-to-air TV. In October 2011, FIC purchased Viajar, a Spanish television travel channel, from Prisa TV.

On January 23, 2012, FIC and RCN Televisión announced that they would launch a new Spanish-language terrestrial television network named MundoFox in the United States as a joint venture. The network was formally launched on August 13 that year. Fox exited the joint venture in 2015, and the network was renamed as MundoMax on July 28 that year, before it ceased operations on November 30, 2016.

In May 2012, Fox International Channels Latin America announced that it would acquire MGM's share in LAPTV, which operated The Film Zone, Cinecanal and Moviecity. In October 2013, FIC purchased Paramount's shares in LAPTV to become the sole owner. LAPTV's businesses were later folded into FIC Latin America, and Moviecity was relaunched as Fox+ in November 2014.

Former Fox Networks Group president David Haslingden's Racat Group purchased NHNZ, a New Zealand-based production company for documentaries, and its sister company, Singapore-based company Beach House Pictures, in October 2012 from Fox.

Portugal-based Fluid Youth Culture purchased Fuel TV by January 2013. On July 1, 2013, Fox Crime was replaced by Fox Network in Norway. FIC also renamed its premium Dutch network Eredivisie Live to Fox Sports Eredivisie, with its channels renamed as Fox Sports 1 through 3. In the third quarter of 2013, FIC's French-language channels, including National Geographic Channel, Nat Geo Wild and the travel-based Voyage, were expanded to Africa via RRsat's Global Network and Measat's Africasat-1a.

On November 6, 2013, Fox International Channels acquired Setanta Africa Services Limited, operator of three Africa sports channels, Setanta Africa (English and French), Zuku Sports (East Africa) and the Setanta Action. Setanta Africa and Setanta Action were branded as Fox Sports and Fox Sports 2, respectively in August 2014 at the 2014–15 football league kick-off.

In October 2014, Fox Crime (Spain) was replaced with FoxLife, with the latter's series moving primarily to Fox. FIC Turkey, its pay company, and Fox Turkey, its free to air company, were merged in late 2014. In the third quarter of 2014, a Fox-branded channel was launched in Sweden via Com Hem.

On November 27, 2014, FIC acquired Jan Dekker Holdings' stake of the 24Kitchen joint venture. FIC also closed the venture's production facility.

In 2014, A&E Networks Italy (formed in late 2013) took full ownership of the Italian version of History TV channel from FIC Italy. In early 2014, the versions of Nat Geo Adventure in Asia and Pacific were relaunched as Nat Geo People. On October 1, 2015, Fox International Channels UK launched YourTV, which would target female viewers, on Freeview and YouView.

In January 2016, 21st Century Fox announced a major reorganization of Fox International Channels. The heads of FIC's regional divisions would report to CEO Peter Rice and COO Randy Freer at Fox Networks Group in the United States, instead of the outgoing FIC CEO Hernan Lopez. Also, the regional divisions were renamed Fox Networks Group Europe, Fox Networks Group Latin America and Fox Networks Group Asia. This effectively abolished Fox International Channels as a separate unit from 21st Century Fox's television business in the U.S. All three international divisions of Fox Networks Group were collectively referred as Fox Networks Group International in 21CF's formal documents (including the group's annual reports).

On December 5, 2017, 21st Century Fox appointed Uday Shankar, chairman and CEO of Star India, as the company's president for Asia. The new role would oversee Fox's television and online video platform business across the region, and the president of Fox Networks Group Asia would report directly to Shankar (instead of the equivalent at FNG U.S.).

Post-Disney acquisition
On December 14, 2017, The Walt Disney Company formally announced its intention to acquire most of 21st Century Fox assets. Businesses to be bought by Disney included FX Networks, a share in National Geographic Partners, and international operations of Fox Networks Group. The Murdoch family would retain the ownership of Fox Broadcasting Company, Fox Television Stations, U.S. domestic operations of Fox Sports, Fox News Channel and Fox Business Network, through a new company, eventually named Fox Corporation. Disney also acquired the regional Fox Sports Networks, but the U.S. Department of Justice ordered that those assets be sold within 90 days of closing of the deal due to Disney's majority ownership of ESPN.

On March 19, 2019, Fox Corporation was officially spun off from 21st Century Fox, and began trading on the Nasdaq. The next day, March 20, The Walt Disney Company completed the acquisition of 21st Century Fox. This rendered Fox Networks Group as a standalone unit abolished. Within Disney, FX Networks and U.S. operations of National Geographic television channels were placed under Walt Disney Television, Disney's new U.S. domestic television unit. 20th Century Fox Television and Fox 21 Television Studios became a part of Disney Television Studios, and Fox Networks Group CEO Peter Rice was appointed as the Chairman of Walt Disney Television. The international businesses of Fox Networks Group would be integrated with Disney's Direct-to-Consumer & International division.

YourTV UK channel was shut down on September 27, 2019.

On January 17, 2020, Disney dropped the "Fox" name from the 20th Century Studios and Searchlight Pictures film units, though there were no mention of changes to Fox Networks Group or other Disney-owned Fox-branded units.

Units

International

Former (United States) Units
 Fox Networks Digital Consumer Group – Non-linear online video services including FXNOW, FOXNOW, Nat Geo TV and Fox Sports Go

Fox Television Group
 Fox Broadcasting Company – spun off to Fox Corporation
 20th Century Fox Television – transferred to Walt Disney Television
 Fox 21 Television Studios
 Fox Television Animation
 20th Television
 Lincolnwood Drive, Inc.

Fox Cable Networks

National Geographic Partners
(transferred to Walt Disney Television)
A partnership with National Geographic Society in which Fox owned 73%
 National Geographic Global Networks
 National Geographic
 Nat Geo Kids
 Nat Geo Music
 Nat Geo People
 Nat Geo Wild
 National Geographic Studios
 National Geographic Media,  print, digital publishing, travel and tour operations

FX Networks
(transferred to Walt Disney Television)
 FX
 FXX
 FX Movie Channel
 FX Productions
 DNA TV Limited – Joint venture with DNA Films, run by DNA Films' management

Fox Sports Media Group
 Fox Sports – spun off to Fox Corporation, along with other nationwide cable channels and the Big Ten Network
 Fox Sports 1 
 Fox Sports 2
 Fox Deportes
 Fox Soccer Plus
 Big Ten Network (51% owned in joint venture with Big Ten Conference)
 Fox Sports Networks – sold to Diamond Sports Group, a joint venture between Sinclair Broadcasting Group and Entertainment Studios
 Arizona
 Detroit
 Florida/Sun
 Midwest (subfeeds: Indiana, Kansas City)
 North
 Ohio/SportsTime Ohio
 South / Fox Sports Southeast (subfeeds: Carolinas, Tennessee)
 Southwest (subfeeds: Oklahoma, New Orleans)
 West/Prime Ticket (subfeed: San Diego)
 Wisconsin
 YES Network (80% equity)
 Fox College Sports – sold to Diamond Sports Group, a joint venture between Sinclair and Entertainment Studios
 Home Team Sports (HTS) advertising sales for sports channels including other regional sports networks plus commercial and program production, events, and local live custom brand integration  – sold to Playfly Sports
 Fox Sports College Properties – college rights holder for Big East Conference, several colleges: Michigan State, Auburn, San Diego State, Georgetown and USC and the Los Angeles Memorial Coliseum
 Impression Sports & Entertainment – naming rights and event sponsorships

Fox Television Stations Group
(spun off to Fox Corporation)
 Fox Television Stations
 28 stations
 MyNetworkTV
 Movies! (50%)

Fox News Group
(spun off to Fox Corporation)
 Fox News Channel
 Fox Business
 Fox News Radio
 Fox News Talk
 Fox Nation

Divisions

Fox Networks Digital Consumer Group
Fox Networks Digital Consumer Group (FNDCG) was a division of 21st Century Fox. After the Disney transaction, FX Now and Nat Geo TV moved to Walt Disney Television while Fox Now was transferred to Fox Corporation and Fox Sports Go was sold to Diamond Sports Group, a joint venture between Sinclair Broadcast Group and Entertainment Studios.

Fox Networks Group Content Distribution
Fox Networks Group Content Distribution was a global distributor of high-quality scripted and unscripted programming and formats. It is a division of Fox Networks Group.

Fox Networks Engineering & Operations
Fox Networks Engineering & Operations was the engineering and operation arm for Fox Networks Group.

Fox Global Networks
Fox Global Networks was a division of Fox Networks Group that is responsible for the distribution and marketing of Fox Networks Group USA.

Fox Media
Fox Media was a division of Fox Networks Group that enables innovative ad sales partnerships, including native advertising and branded content, across multiple platforms.

Fox Hispanic Media
Fox Hispanic Media was the advertisement sales arm of Fox’s portfolio of Spanish-language brands.

Fox Television Group (division)
Fox Television Group was a division of Fox Networks Group that oversees television content.

Fox Cable Networks (division)
Fox Cable Networks was an American entertainment industry company that operates through four segments, mainly filmed entertainment, television stations, television broadcasting networks, and cable network programming.

See also
 Fox Broadcasting Company
 Walt Disney Television

References

 
American companies established in 1993
Broadcasting companies of the United States
Former News Corporation subsidiaries
Mass media companies established in 1993
The Walt Disney Company subsidiaries